Today Bandha Ghorar Dim or Toray Bandha Ghorar Dim is a collection of nonsense rhymes by the acclaimed Indian film director Satyajit Ray in Bengali. The collection contains several translated rhymes and limericks besides some original works by him. The book included a translation of Lewis Carroll's Jabberwocky. Translations from Edward Lear and Hilaire Belloc  were also there in the collection.

1986 children's books
1986 poetry books
Children's poetry books
Books by Satyajit Ray
Indian children's literature
Nonsense poetry
Bengali-language literature
Indian poetry collections